Tower Ticker was a column in the Chicago Tribune, and later a blog. It was originated by Jimmy Savage in 1948 and focused on "night life, show business, and the activities of people in the news".

It has been conducted by:
 Jimmy Savage, 1948–1951 (credited as "Savage")
 Will Leonard
 Herb Lyon, 1954–1968
 Robert Wiedrich
 Aaron Gold ( –1983)
(hiatus)
 Phil Rosenthal (column and blog) (2005–2011)

Notes

External references
 Tower Ticker blog

Columns (periodical)
Chicago Tribune